Jih may refer to:
 Jamaat-e-Islami Hind, an Islamic organisation in India
 jih, the ISO 639-3 language code for the sTodsde language, a Rgyalrongic language of China
 UL-Jih, a Czech aircraft manufacturer
 Tammy Jih, American lawyer and Amazing Race contestant
 Victor Jih, American lawyer and Amazing Race contestant

See also
 G (disambiguation)
 Gee (disambiguation)
 Ghee (disambiguation)
 Gi (disambiguation)
 Ji (disambiguation)